Giovanni Musy (August 3, 1931 – October 7, 2011) was an Italian actor and dubbing artist.

Biography
Born in Milan, the son of actors Enrico Glori and  Gianna Pacetti, he started his career as a child actor at eleven years old. He studied at the Accademia di Belle Arti in his hometown. Starting from the late 1950s, Musy  began an intense career as a character actor, being often cast in roles of villain. Musy became best known through his television work, notably the RAI TV-series Le inchieste del commissario Maigret, E le stelle stanno a guardare, Dov'è Anna.

Musy was also very active as a voice actor and a dubber. He was the primary Italian voice of Dumbledore from the Harry Potter film franchise as well as Gandalf from The Lord of the Rings. He sometimes dubbed actors such as Richard Harris, Marlon Brando, Christopher Plummer, Sean Connery, George Peppard, James Coburn and more.

Personal life
Musy was the father of voice actress Stella Musy. He also had another daughter, Mascia from his first marriage to actress Rada Rassimov.

Death
Musy died in Mentana of a long illness on October 7, 2011 at the age of 80.

Selected filmography
 Harlem (1943)
 Sicilian Uprising (1949)
 The Cadets of Gascony (1950)
 Side Street Story (1950)
 Il caimano del Piave (1951)
 Who Is Without Sin (1952)
 La peccatrice dell'isola (1952)
 The Man in My Life (1952)
 Desert Desperadoes (1959)
 His Women (1961)
 Jessica (1962)
 The Man Who Laughs (1966)
 Per amore... per magia... (1967)
 The Boss (1973)
 The Cynic, the Rat and the Fist (1977)
 The Gang That Sold America (1979)
 Asso (1981)
 State buoni se potete (1983)
 Faccione (1991)
 Giovanni Falcone (1993)
 Piazza Fontana: The Italian Conspiracy (2012)

Dubbing roles

Animation
Zeus in Hercules
Billy Bones in Treasure Planet
Kashekim Nedakh in Atlantis: The Lost Empire
Papa Smurf in The Smurfs
Mayor Tortoise John in Rango

Live action
Albus Dumbledore in Harry Potter and the Philosopher's Stone
Albus Dumbledore in Harry Potter and the Chamber of Secrets
Albus Dumbledore in Harry Potter and the Prisoner of Azkaban
Albus Dumbledore in Harry Potter and the Goblet of Fire
Albus Dumbledore in Harry Potter and the Order of the Phoenix
Albus Dumbledore in Harry Potter and the Half-Blood Prince
Albus Dumbledore in Harry Potter and the Deathly Hallows – Part 1
Albus Dumbledore in Harry Potter and the Deathly Hallows – Part 2
Gandalf in The Lord of the Rings: The Fellowship of the Ring
Gandalf in The Lord of the Rings: The Two Towers
Gandalf in The Lord of the Rings: The Return of the King
Ki-Adi-Mundi in Star Wars: Episode I – The Phantom Menace
Ki-Adi-Mundi in Star Wars: Episode II – Attack of the Clones
Ki-Adi-Mundi in Star Wars: Episode III – Revenge of the Sith

References

External links

 
 
 
 

1931 births
2011 deaths
Male actors from Milan
Italian male film actors
Italian male child actors
Italian male stage actors
Italian male television actors
Italian male voice actors
Italian lyricists
Italian voice directors
Italian people of French descent
People of Campanian descent
People of Tuscan descent
20th-century Italian male actors
21st-century Italian male actors